Juan Pablo Brzezicki (born 12 April 1982) is a retired Argentine professional tennis player.

Tennis career

In 2007, Brzezicki was the Argentine surprise at the French Open, one of the four tennis Grand Slams, by reaching the third round before losing to his idol Carlos Moyà of Spain. He won his first Challenger singles title in 2007 at Salinas, Ecuador. With Juan Pablo Guzmán, he won his first ATP doubles title at Amersfoort in 2007. He reached a career-high singles ranking of World No. 94 in February 2008.

In February 2012, after his participation in the ATP 250 in Buenos Aires he announced that he retired after eleven years.

Performance timeline

Singles

ATP career finals

Doubles: 1 (1 title)

ATP Challenger and ITF Futures finals

Singles: 23 (7–16)

Doubles: 36 (21–15)

References

External links
 
 

1982 births
Living people
Argentine male tennis players
Argentine people of Polish descent
Tennis players from Buenos Aires